Tojiri station is a railway station in Toji-ri, Hanggu-guyŏk, Namp'o Special City, North Korea. It is the terminus of the Tojiri Line from Namp'o on the P'yŏngnam Line of the Korean State Railway.

Services
This station was built to serve the Namp'o Smelting Complex, which processed nonferrous metals, shipping gold, zinc, coarse and refined copper, copper wire and chemical fertilisers. It received ore and concentrates from mines at Taedae-ri and Suan.

References

Railway stations in North Korea